In the early morning of December 24, 2012, firefighters responding to a fire in West Webster, New York, a suburb of Rochester, were fired upon by 62-year-old William H. Spengler, who was believed to have deliberately set the fire. Two of the firefighters were killed.

Shooting
According to police, Spengler set his house on 191 Lake Road and the family car on fire in the early morning hours of Christmas Eve, and then armed himself with three guns: a Smith & Wesson .38-caliber revolver, a Mossberg 12-gauge shotgun, and a .223-caliber Bushmaster AR-15 style rifle. When firefighters arrived shortly after 5:30 a.m., Spengler ambushed them from an earthen berm across the street from his house. Two firefighters were killed, and two others were injured.

Spengler exchanged shots with police, who arrived with an armored truck to remove the firefighters and 33 nearby civilians.  Spengler ran after getting shot at and died when he shot himself in the head. His body was discovered nearly six hours later. Due to the shooting, fire crews were unable to resume fighting the blaze until 11:30 a.m. By then, six other houses had burned to the ground, and two others had been rendered uninhabitable.

A severely burned body found inside Spengler's house is believed to be Spengler's 67-year-old sister Cheryl, with whom he was living. A two-to-three-page typewritten letter written by Spengler was found at the scene. It reflected Spengler's intent to ambush first responders, but offered no motive for the shooting. In it, he wrote, "I still have to get ready to see how much of the neighborhood I can burn down, and do what I like doing best, killing people."

Victims
The two firefighters killed in the shooting were 43-year-old Michael Chiapperini, Past Chief of the West Webster Fire District and Lieutenant and public information officer for the Webster Police Department, and 19-year-old Tomasz Kaczowka, who also worked as a 911 dispatcher. The two wounded firefighters were Joseph Hofstetter, who was shot in the pelvis (with the bullet then  lodged in his spine), and Theodore Scardino, who was shot in the chest and knee. Both were hospitalized at Strong Memorial Hospital for serious injuries, and were declared to be in stable condition. In addition to the two wounded firefighters, police officer Jon Ritter was slightly injured when a bullet hit the windshield of his car.

Perpetrator
Police identified the gunman as 62-year-old local resident William H. Spengler Jr. Spengler previously spent 17 years in prison for murdering his 92-year-old grandmother with a hammer in 1980. He had not attracted the attention of police since then. William Spengler "could not stand" his sister Cheryl, according to a friend, Roger Vercruysse. Spengler's mother Arline, to whom he was said to have been close, died two months earlier.

Investigators immediately began focusing on how Spengler obtained the gun. New York, like nearly all other states, bars convicted felons from buying, owning or possessing a firearm. Before the day was out, agents with the Bureau of Alcohol, Tobacco and Firearms discovered that the Bushmaster rifle and the shotgun had been purchased in June 2010 at Gander Mountain in Henrietta, another Rochester suburb. The owner of record was Dawn Nguyen, a neighbor of Spengler, who had recently moved to the suburb of Greece. In an interview with agents that night, Nguyen admitted to buying the guns, but claimed they had then been stolen. However, according to investigators, Nguyen texted a Monroe County sheriff's deputy the next day and admitted buying the guns for Spengler in an illegal straw purchase. On December 28, William Hochul, the United States Attorney for the Western District of New York, announced that Nguyen had been arrested and charged with knowingly making a false statement in connection with the purchase of a firearm from a Federal Firearms Licensee. She also faces state charges of filing a false business record—the form she filled out stating that she was the owner of the guns. In 2014, Nguyen was sentenced to eight years in prison for her involvement.

Reaction
In a statement, New York Governor Andrew Cuomo said, "All of our thoughts and prayers go to the families and friends of those who were killed in this senseless act of violence." New York Attorney General Eric Schneiderman also said, "The contributions made by the fallen and injured officers in Webster will never be forgotten."

As part of the NY SAFE Act, the New York Penal Law section on aggravated murder was amended to increase penalties for murdering a first responder (the "Webster" provision, named for this incident) to life in prison without parole.

See also
Gun violence in the United States

References

2012 active shooter incidents in the United States
2012 crimes in New York (state)
2012 mass shootings in the United States
2012 murders in the United States
Arson in New York (state)
Attacks in the United States in 2012
Deaths by firearm in New York (state)
December 2012 crimes in the United States
Mass shootings in New York (state)
Mass shootings in the United States
Monroe County, New York
Murder in New York (state)
Murder–suicides in New York
Suicides by firearm in New York (state)